Sunnyburn is an unincorporated community in York County, Pennsylvania, United States. It is located on Pennsylvania Route 74 3 miles south of Airville.

References

Unincorporated communities in York County, Pennsylvania
Unincorporated communities in Pennsylvania